Aeryon Labs is a Canadian developer and manufacturer of Unmanned Aerial Vehicles. Founded in 2007, it is headquartered in Waterloo, Ontario. Aeryon Defense is a wholly owned subsidiary, based in Denver, Colorado, focused on sales and support for the US Government. The company was purchased by FLIR Systems in January 2019 for US$200 million.

Products
Aeryon Labs' UAVs have a field interchangeable payload interface to support multiple payloads.  All imaging payloads are stabilized and include high resolution stills, optical zoom video, thermal Imaging, HD video, and dual EO/IR video/still camera. The company's UAVs are:

 Aeryon Scout (discontinued)
 Aeryon SkyRanger R60
 Aeryon SkyRanger R80

Awards
David Kroetsch and Michael Peasgood of Aeryon Labs won the Canadian Aeronautics and Space Institute's 2012 Trans-Canada Trophy. The oldest aviation award in Canada (established in 1927), the Trophy is awarded for outstanding achievement in aviation.

Aeryon was listed on the Deloitte Technology Fast 50 in 2014, 2015 and 2016

Notable Uses
In 2011 the company provided a Scout UAV to the Free Libyan Air Force.

In 2018, the SkyRanger drone provided support for disaster response following Hurricane Irma.

References

External links
 

Aircraft manufacturers of Canada
Canadian subsidiaries of foreign companies
Unmanned aerial vehicle manufacturers
2007 establishments in Ontario
Canadian brands
Manufacturing companies established in 2007
Canadian companies established in 2007
Companies based in Waterloo, Ontario
2019 mergers and acquisitions